Mary Karr (born January 16, 1955) is an American poet, essayist and memoirist from East Texas. She is widely noted for her 1995 bestselling memoir The Liars' Club. Karr is the Jesse Truesdell Peck Professor of English Literature at Syracuse University.

Career

Memoirs 
Karr's memoir The Liars' Club, published in 1995, was a New York Times bestseller for over a year, and was named one of the year's best books. It explores her deeply troubled childhood, most of which was spent in a gritty industrial section of Southeast Texas in the 1960s. Karr was encouraged to write her personal history by her friend Tobias Wolff, but has said she only took up the project when her marriage fell apart.

She followed the book with a second memoir, Cherry (2000), about her late adolescence and early womanhood.

A third memoir, Lit: A Memoir, which she says details "my journey from blackbelt sinner and lifelong agnostic to unlikely Catholic," came out in November 2009. The memoir describes Karr's time as an alcoholic and the salvation she found in her conversion to Catholicism. She describes herself as a cafeteria Catholic.

Poetry 
Karr won a 1989 Whiting Award for her poetry. She was a Guggenheim Fellow in poetry in 2005 and has won Pushcart prizes for both her poetry and essays. Karr has published five volumes of poetry: Abacus (Wesleyan University Press, CT, 1987, in its New Poets series), The Devil's Tour (New Directions NY, 1993, an original TPB), Viper Rum (New Directions NY, 1998, an original TPB), Sinners Welcome (HarperCollins, NY, 2006), and Tropic of Squalor (HarperCollins, NY, 2018). Her poems have appeared in major literary magazines such as Poetry, The New Yorker, and The Atlantic Monthly.

Karr's Pushcart Award-winning essay, "Against Decoration", was originally published in the quarterly review Parnassus (1991) and later reprinted in Viper Rum. In "Against Decoration", Karr took a stand in favor of content over poetic style. She argued emotions need to be directly expressed and clarity should be a watch-word: characters are too obscure, the presented physical world is often "foggy" (that is imprecise), references are "showy" (both non-germane and overused), metaphors overshadow expected meaning, and techniques of language (polysyllables, archaic words, intricate syntax, "yards of adjectives") only "slow a reader's understanding".

Another essay, "Facing Altars: Poetry and Prayer", was originally published in Poetry (2005). Karr tells of moving from agnostic alcoholic to baptized Catholic of the decidedly "cafeteria" kind, yet one who prays twice daily with loud fervor from her "foxhole". In this essay, Karr argues that poetry and prayer arise from the same sources within us.

Other 
In May 2015, Karr served as the commencement speaker at the 161st commencement for Syracuse University.

Personal life 
Karr was born in Groves, Texas, on January 16, 1955, and lived there until she moved to Los Angeles in 1972. That same year, Karr started at Macalester College in St. Paul, Minnesota, where she studied for two years and met poet Etheridge Knight, one of her first mentors. Karr later attended and graduated from Goddard College, where she studied with the poets Robert Hass and Stephen Dobyns.

Karr was married to poet Michael Milburn for 13 years. At some point, she had a relationship with author David Foster Wallace. Karr spoke out about Wallace's abusive behaviour, which included years of stalking, throwing a coffee table at her, and harassing her five-year-old son.

Although a convert to Catholicism, Karr supports views that are at odds with Catholic Church teaching: on abortion she is pro-choice, and she has spoken in favor of women's ordination to the priesthood. Karr has described herself as a feminist since age 12.

Awards and honors
1989 Whiting Award
1995 PEN/Martha Albrand Award for The Liars' Club
2005 Guggenheim Fellowship

Works 

Memoirs
 The Liars' Club, Viking Adult; (1995) 
 Cherry: A Memoir, Penguin Books; Reissue edition (2001) 
 Lit: A Memoir, HarperCollins; (2009) 

Poetry
 Abacus, Wesleyan (1987)
 The Devil's Tour, New Directions (1993) 
 Viper Rum, Penguin (2001) 
 Sinners Welcome, HarperCollins (2006) 
 Tropic of Squalor, HarperCollins (2018) 

Stories
 "Learner's Permit" (excerpt from Cherry). Nerve, w/o date.

Non-Fiction

 The Art of Memoir, Harper; (2015)

References

External links
 
 
 Paris Review Interview
 Mary Karr Author Page on harpercollins.com
 Profile at The Whiting Foundation
 Mary Karr, Remembering The Years She Spent 'Lit', November 3, 2009, NPR, Fresh Air
 Mary Karr biography at enotes.com
 NPR Interview with Karr for new poetry collection Sinners Welcome
 Salon Interview, May 1997
 Syracuse University - Faculty Biography page
 Rain Taxi Interview, Spring 2010
 Mary Karr Talks 'Tropic of Squalor,' Grinding Through Drafts, and Cellos, The Creative Nonfiction Podcast with Brendan O'Meara

1955 births
20th-century American poets
21st-century American poets
20th-century American women writers
American women poets
Converts to Roman Catholicism from atheism or agnosticism
Living people
Roman Catholic writers
Syracuse University faculty
American women memoirists
American memoirists
People from Jefferson County, Texas
Writers from Texas
20th-century American non-fiction writers
21st-century American non-fiction writers
Catholics from Texas
21st-century American women writers
Catholic feminists
American women academics